Brontëan  (or, less frequently, Brontean) means "pertaining to or characteristic of the works of..." 

The Brontë family, a literary family, or any of its members:
 Anne Brontë, novelist and poet
 Branwell Brontë, painter and poet
 Charlotte Brontë, novelist and poet
 Emily Brontë, novelist and poet
 Patrick Brontë, curate and writer